Absolute risk (or AR) is the probability or chance of an event. It is usually used for the number of events (such as a disease) that occurred in a group, divided by the number of people in that group.

Absolute risk is one of the most understandable ways of communicating health risks to the general public.

See also
 Absolute risk reduction
 Relative risk
 Relative risk reduction

External links
 Know Your Chances: Understanding Health Statistics

References

Medical terminology